Several different minor league baseball teams played in the city of Alameda, California from 1906 to 1915.

These included:
The Alameda Grays (1906–1907) and Alameda Encinals (1908) of the California League
The Alameda Alerts (1910–1911), Alameda  (1911) and Alameda Monday Models (1911) of the Central California League.
Two separate Alameda clubs that played in the California State League in 1906 and 1915.

References
Baseball Reference

baseball teams
 
 
Defunct baseball teams in California
Professional baseball teams in California
Defunct California League teams
Defunct California State League teams
Defunct Central California League teams
Baseball teams established in 1906
Baseball teams disestablished in 1915
1906 establishments in California
1915 disestablishments in California